Japaridze is a Georgian noble family known from c. 1400.

A family legend recorded by Prince Ioann of Georgia in his genealogical treatise holds it that the Jap'aridze descended from the Mongol ("Chingisid") officer in Racha called Jap'ar whose scions later converted to Georgian Orthodox Christianity and were ennobled by the kings of Georgia. They possibly held the Duchy of Racha between the disappearance of the Kakhaberidze and the establishment of the Chkhetidze (1273-1488). The Jap'aridze formed several lines: a princely one in the Kingdom of Imereti, and a petite noble branches in the kingdoms of Kartli, Kakheti, and Imereti.

Under the Russian rule, the family was received among the princely nobility in 1850.  

In 1882, Agrippina Japaridze (1855—1927), former Princess Dadiani married Duke Constantine Petrovich of Oldenburg (1850—1906) and received for her and her descendants the title of Count(ess) von Zarnekau (She was deemed ineligible for the title of Duchess of Oldenburg due to the marriage being considered morganatic.

References 

Noble families of Georgia (country)
Russian noble families
Georgian-language surnames